George Purdy Bullard (April 14, 1869 – July 25, 1924) was an American lawyer and Democratic Party politician. Bullard was the first Attorney General of Arizona after it gained statehood.

Life and career 
George Purdy Bullard was born in 1869 in Portland, Oregon. His family moved to San Francisco, California during his childhood.

He studied law, was admitted to the bar in California and started practicing law at the age of 21. In 1899 he moved to the Arizona Territory and settled there in Phoenix, where he lived for the next 25 years. Bullard served as Maricopa County Attorney for five years. In 1911 he was elected Attorney General of Arizona . Bullard was the first person to hold this post after Arizona became a state. His term ended in 1915, after which he returned to practicing law.

He was president of the first automobile club founded in Arizona and participated in car racing. After the death of Eugene S. Ives (1859–1917), he was appointed Chief Counsel in Arizona by the railway company Southern Pacific Lines. He also worked as an attorney for the Arizona Power Company.

At the time of his death in 1924, Bullard was in Los Angeles because of the planned merger between Southern Pacific Lines and El Paso and Southwestern Lines . Bullard was buried at the Greenwood Memory Lawn Cemetery in Phoenix, Arizona.

He was married to Pearl S. McHenry (1879–1943).

Notes

References 
 George Purdy Bullard Dies In Angel City, Prescott Evening Courier, 25. July 1924, S. 1
 Portrait and biographical record of Arizona, Chapman Publishing, S. 357
 Bullard, George Purdy : Attorney General for the State of Arizona, Phoenix, Arizona, Chicago : International News Service, 1913, OCLC: 173688986

External links 

Arizona Attorneys General
1869 births
1924 deaths
Arizona Democrats
Lawyers from Portland, Oregon
19th-century American lawyers